Treptoceras is a fossil cephalopod genus included in the orthocerid family Proteoceratidae.

Fossil record
It has been found in Ordovician rocks dated from about 460.9 to 445.6  Ma in South Korea and United States.

Species
†Treptoceras cincinnatiensis Miller 1875
†Treptoceras duseri Hall and Whitfield 1875
†Treptoceras fosteri Miller 1875
†Treptoceras transversum Miller 1875
†Treptoceras yokoyamai Kobayashi 1927

References

Orthocerida
Ordovician cephalopods
Taxa named by Rousseau H. Flower
Ordovician cephalopods of North America